Radian (Louis Armanetti) is a fictional character, a superhero in the Marvel Universe, member of the Strikeforce: Morituri. The character was created by Peter B. Gillis and Brent Anderson.

Publication history
Radian (Louis Armanetti) was created by writer Peter B. Gillis and artist Brent Anderson and debuted in Strikeforce: Morituri #1 (December 1986). The codename "Radian" was introduced in issue #2. Radian remained in the regular cast of the book until his death in Strikeforce: Morituri #15.

Fictional character biography
Virtually nothing is known of Louis Armanetti's life, prior to his decision to join the Strikeforce: Morituri. A jokester and quick to mask his insecurities and fears behind jokes, in 2073, Armanetti volunteered for the Morituri process, a revolutionary scientific progress which gifts ordinary people with superhuman abilities. Armanetti was found genetically compatible for the process, one of only a handful among thousands of applicants. However, the recipients gained their powers at a terrible price: a fatal flaw in the process which ensures their death within a year of receiving it. The objective of this process was the formation of a team of superpowered beings which could be utilized as Earth's combatants in Earth's ongoing war against the savage alien race known as the Horde.

Despite his knowledge of certain death within a year, Armanetti underwent the process, and became part of the first official generation of Strikeforce: Morituri. After all members of the Morituri had successfully underwent the process, they were dispatched to the Biowar Zone Alpha (nicknamed "the Garden"), a specially designed facility filled with several dangerous traps. The objective of this test was to have their superhuman powers manifest under great pressure, instead of waiting for months. The only member who did not undertake the "Garden" treatment was Blackthorn whose powers had already surfaced naturally.

Armanetti exhibited extreme self-confidence upon entering the Garden. However, he was quickly paralyzed by a nerve gas.  His confidence was crushed, as he began realizing he might die and burn in Hell eternally, as a punishment for not being religious all these years. The shock of the experience unlocked his ability to emit electromagnetic radiation blasts and he managed to set himself free by burning the gas toxins in his body. Subsequently, he took on the nom de guerre "Radian" and designed a costume with special sleeves, which helped him focus his blasts more effectively.

Radian soon participated in the first official battle of Strikeforce: Morituri, which took place in Kramatorsk, Soviet Union. During the battle, he realized that his powers were even more effective when combined with the plasma blasts released by his teammate, Snapdragon. The two paired up in battles, utilizing their powers in unison, until Snapdragon died of the Morituri effect.

Radian was the first team member to show visible concern over their lives being thrown away. After Vyking's death in a spaceship en route to the Horde fleet, Radian was the only one to oppose the idea of continuing with their mission, although he complied when the team decided to keep on. Nevertheless, the team succeeded in its mission.

Hope for a cure
Following Vyking's demise, Radian, who was used to taking orders in battle, began looking for another leader figure and tried to pressure his new teammate, Toxyn, into this position, much against her chagrin. Later, during a battle with the Horde, one of them managed to slip a videocassette in Radian's costume. Radian was unaware of it until he returned to the Morituri base. In his room, Radian watched the cassette alone. Through the cassette, the Kind Inquirer of the Horde made Radian a tempting offer: he professed possessing a cure for the deadly Morituri effect. As proof, the Horde warlord produced Bruce Higashi, a member of the Black Watch, the first team of volunteers to undergo the process. Higashi had been believed killed in the first and only battle of the Watch that had taken place months ago. In the video, though, Higashi appeared to be still alive, albeit a captive of the Horde, approximately sixteen months after he had been subjected to the Morituri process, meaning he had long outlived the time limit of the deadly effect.

Radian was torn between his devotion to the team, and his desire to evade the certain death that awaited him, which to him equalled suicide. That same day, teammate Scaredycat presented him with a communication she had intercepted, which proved that the team's employers, the Paedia Council, were discouraging Dr. Kimmo Tuolema, inventor of the process, from searching for a cure for the Morituri effect. An indignant Radian made up his mind and called the number that the Horde had left him on the cassette.

The team privately discussed Scaredycat's finding and pondered on their options. However, despite their anger for being treated as expendable pawns, they all seemed to brush it off, with the exception of Radian. More and more troubled, Radian again communicated with the Horde and made an agreement with them.

Negotiations with the Horde
Just then, the team was alerted by yet another alarm about a Horde attack. Even though the team was not officially called to action, due to the limited size of the attack, Radian took the initiative and led the team to a cruise ship that had been taken over by the Horde. Apparently, Vyking's parents were on board as passengers and the Horde took them hostage, hoping to lure the team, knowing they would not refrain from helping their dead leader's parents. The team prevailed in the ensuing battle and took over the Horde ship that had realized the attack. However, just then, Radian communicated with the other Horde ships that participated in the attack, and pretended to go along with their agreed plan of delivering all the team into their hands. The team lashed at him, but Radian, either accidentally or on purpose, drove the commandeered ship in space, thus breaking his deal with the Hordians.

Nevertheless, the team accused Radian of being a traitor. It was only after Radian claimed that he had done all this in order for them to commandeer a Horde ship and for their teammate, Adept, to come in contact again with invaluable artifact stashed in their space fleet and catalogue them in her memories through her analytic abilities, that they were convinced of his good intentions. After the success of the mission, the team returned to Earth, now facing charges of misconduct. Eventually, the team was acquitted.

Betrayal
However, Radian still faced the same ethical dilemma of whether his death of the Morituri effect equalled suicide and whether he should pursue a possible cure that could save all the Morituri's lives, including the life of Blackthorn's unborn baby. He even visited a nun, asking for enlightenment, but she assured him that his death as Earth's hero did not signify suicide. Radian then visited Dr. Kimmo Tuolema, the inventor of the process and asked him if a cure was likely to be found. Tuolema dashed his hopes, revealing that one of his colleagues, who was vital in the research for the cure, was kidnapped years ago by the Horde and possibly killed by them, making the prospect of a cure in the near future highly unlikely. After that, Radian contemplated that the Horde's story of possessing the cure could be true. Shortly afterwards, the team faced the Super-Hordians, a genetically mutated breed of more powerful Hordians. The team was almost vanquished by them, before Radian decided to turn himself over to the Super-Hordians, allowing himself to be led to their leader.

Radian was taken in the Horde's Earthbound base, in Cape Town, where the Kind Inquirer presented Radian with the captive Bruce Higashi, reiterating his claims about a cure. Higashi tried to discourage Radian, arguing that what he was suffering now was worse than death, but the Kind Inquirer did not allow him to continue his communication with the Morituri. Radian then asked the Horde warlord if they had procured the cure from Tuolema's colleague, Dr. Ledbetter, which the Kind Inquirer confirmed. He also informed Radian that they would not hold him captive, but he still had to pay a price. Indeed, Radian was forced to transmit a message throughout the globe, in which he informed the public that there is, in fact, a cure for the Morituri effect, but the Paedia refrains from discovering it, wanting to keep their superpowered warriors under check. He also publicly denounced the Paedia and its actions.

Death
Shortly afterwards, Radian was returned to Earth and confronted his teammates. They all lashed at him for his perceived betrayal and one of them, the aggressive Shear, mortally wounded him. As he lay dying, Radian confessed to Blackthorn, by then his closest confidant, that there is no cure and the Horde were lying. Apparently, a "Dr. Ledbetter" doesn't exist and Radian called in their bluff. He also explained that his purpose, to die in battle instead of "committing suicide" (i.e. dying of the Morituri effect) had been achieved. Blackthorn forgave him. After Radian died, Shear proceeded to spit on his face.

Powers and abilities
Radian had the ability to emit E-M radiation across the whole spectrum, from radio lines to low level gamma rays, to various effects. He had "focusing sleeves" in his uniform which helped him focus his blasts in battle more effectively. However, during his lifetime, he never achieved coherence, i.e. lasing. Besides the aggressive use of his power, he was seen utilizing his radiation control in different ways, such as burning the nerve toxins in his body, emitting blasts with carrier waves or producing a viable phone signal. As a result of his exposure to the Morituri process, he also had enhanced strength and resilience. Like all Morituri, he also wore special boots which enabled him to fly.

References

Comics characters introduced in 1986
Marvel Comics characters with superhuman strength
Marvel Comics male superheroes
Marvel Comics superheroes
Strikeforce: Morituri